Hisham Tawfiq (born May 17, 1970) is an American actor, best known for playing Dembe Zuma, part of the security detail and very close friend to Raymond "Red" Reddington in NBC's The Blacklist.

Early life 
Born in New York City, Tawfiq discovered his love of the arts while performing the poem "I Know Why the Caged Bird Sings" by Maya Angelou in high school. Tawfiq studied at the Negro Ensemble Company, known for educating actors such as Denzel Washington and Ossie Davis. He also studied with coach Susan Batson.

Prior to pursuing a full acting career, Tawfiq served in the U.S. Marines, deployed during Operation Desert Storm. From 1994 to 1996, Tawfiq worked as a corrections officer in the Sing Sing Correctional Facility in Ossining, New York. While pursuing his acting career, Tawfiq also served as a firefighter for 20 years with the New York City Fire Department.

Career 
Tawfiq performed with The Arkansas Repertory Theatre in Intimate Apparel and played Walter Lee Younger in a production of A Raisin in the Sun, which Tawfiq has said to be his dream role.

Tawfiq starred in the BET film Gun Hill as Capt. Sanford, commander of a counter-crime task force. On television, Tawfiq has appeared in Lights Out, Law & Order spin-offs Special Victims Unit and Criminal Intent, Kings, Golden Boy, 30 Rock, and the 2013 NBC remake of Ironside.

Tawfiq currently plays Dembe in NBC's The Blacklist. Starting with season 3, he was promoted to series regular.

Filmography
Film

Television

Theater

References

External links 
 

1970 births
Living people
American male actors
United States Marine Corps personnel of the Gulf War
New York City firefighters
United States Marines
American Muslims
American people of Kenyan descent